The 2004–05 Honduran Liga Nacional de Ascenso was the 38th season of the Second level in Honduran football and the third one under the name Liga Nacional de Ascenso.  Under the management of Carlos Martínez, Hispano won the tournament after defeating Deportes Savio in the promotion series and obtained promotion to the 2005–06 Honduran Liga Nacional.

Apertura

Postseason

Quarterfinals

 Deportes Savio won 3–2 on aggregate.

 Social Sol won 8–2 on aggregate.

 Águilas del Motagua 0–0 Arsenal on aggregate.  Arsenal won 4–2 on penalties.

 Deportes Concepción won 2–1 on aggregate.

Semifinals

 Deportes Savio won 2–1 on aggregate.

 Social Sol won 3–1 on aggregate.

Final

 Deportes Savio won 6–4 on aggregate.

Clausura

Postseason

Final

 Deportes Savio 3–3 Hispano on aggregate.  Hispano won 6–5 on penalties.

Promotion

 Deportes Savio 1–1 Hispano on aggregate.  Hispano won 8–7 on penalties.

References

Ascenso
2004